Dennis Szczęsny (born 22 November 1993) is a Polish/German handball player for TUSEM Essen and the Polish national team.

Career

National team
He made his debut for the national team on December 28, 2018, in a friendly match against Japan (29:28) where he scored four goals.

References 

1993 births
Living people
Polish male handball players
German male handball players